Hubert Fuchs (born 13 January 1969) is an Austrian politician. He was the state secretary of the Ministry of Finance in the first Kurz government, serving from December 2017 to May 2019. Previously, he served as a Member of the National Council for the Freedom Party of Austria (FPÖ) from 2013 to 2017.

References

1969 births
Living people
Members of the National Council (Austria)
Freedom Party of Austria politicians